The Seychelles News Agency (SNA) is the state news agency of Seychelles. It is headquartered in Victoria and regulated by the Seychelles Media Commission.

History

Launched on 22 April 2014 during the opening of the biennial Seychelles honorary consuls conference held at the Kempinski Resort at Baie Lazare, the SNA is the Seychelles' first online news agency service. It provides daily news service in English and French languages. Most of the SNA's text and photos are free to be published or redistributed so long the agency and author are credited.

References

External links

2014 establishments in Seychelles
Government agencies established in 2014
Mass media in Seychelles
Publicly funded broadcasters
State media